Veerakkanal is 1960 Indian Tamil-language historical action film, directed by G. K. Ramu and produced by P. S. Veerappa. The film stars Gemini Ganesan and Anjali Devi, with M. Saroja, K. A. Thangavelu, Veerappa, M. N. Nambiar, M. N. Rajam and Kamala in supporting roles. It was released on 2 December 1960.

Plot

Cast 
 Gemini Ganesan as Parandhaman
 Anjali Devi as Rajathi
 M. Saroja as Ananthi
 K. A. Thangavelu as Santhosham
 P. S. Veerappa as The King
 M. N. Nambiar as Raghu Devan
 M. N. Rajam as Porkodi
 Kamala as Thenmozhi

Soundtrack 
Music was composed by K. V. Mahadevan and lyrics were written by Kannadasan, A. Maruthakasi and Pattukkottai Kalyanasundaram.

Release and reception 
Veerakkanal was released on 2 December 1960, and was distributed by P. S. V. Pictures in Madras. The Indian Express called the film "a gorgeous costume piece and dance-cum music extravaganza designed to entertain", also praising the sword fights and stunts.

References

External links 
 

1960 films
1960s Tamil-language films
Films directed by K. Shankar
Films scored by K. V. Mahadevan
Indian black-and-white films
Indian historical action films